The HTC Desire 600 is an Android smartphone developed by the Taiwanese manufacturer HTC.

The Desire 600 is a mid-range dual SIM smartphone carrying traits from the HTC One, such as its use of Sense 5, Beats Audio, and BoomSound front stereo speakers. The device uses a 4.5-inch qHD Super LCD 2 display, a 1.2 GHz quad-core Snapdragon 200 processor with 1 GB of RAM, an 8-megapixel camera (lacking the Zoe shooting mode from the One, but still containing the "Highlights" feature), and 64 GB of expandable storage. It was released in Russia, the Middle-East, and Ukraine in June 2013.
The phone is also available in both India and China. It has replaceable battery and microSD slot with support up to 64 GB.

References

External links 

 

Desire 600
Android (operating system) devices
Mobile phones introduced in 2013